Bø is a village and former municipality in Telemark county, Norway. It is part of the traditional region of Midt-Telemark, but was historically regarded as part of Grenland. The administrative centre of the municipality is the village of Bø i Telemark ("Bø in Telemark"). Bø has been a settlement since ancient times, a parish since the middle ages and became a municipality (formannskapsdistrikt) in 1838. The area of Lunde was separated from Bø in 1867 to become a separate municipality. Bø has a population of 5,977 (2015).

Bø's economy is mainly based on agriculture, forestry, tourism, education and public administration. Bø has the character of a university town and is home to one of the principal campuses of the University of Southeast Norway; it was also the seat of one of the university's three predecessor institutions, Telemark University College. Bø is well known for its cultural traditions within traditional music and artisanship, and its central position within Norwegian national romanticism with e.g. its Bunad traditions. Bø has several times been called "the most beautiful place on earth" in modern literature, e.g. in Bjørnstjerne Bjørnson's story En glad Gut (A Happy Boy).

General information

Name
The municipality (originally the parish) is named after the old Bø farm (Old Norse: Bœr), since the first church was built here. The name is identical with the word bœr which means "homestead" or "farm".

Coat-of-arms
The coat-of-arms is from modern times.  They were adopted on 19 February 1988.  The arms show three gold-colored fiddles on a red background.  Bø is historically known for its musical tradition, as well as the production of fiddles (similar to the hardingfele).  The fiddle was thus chosen as an appropriate symbol for the municipality.

Education
In 1923 the county of Telemark decided to start a secondary school in Bø, the equivalent of today's middle school or "ungdomsskole", called Telemark Realskole. At this time secondary schools mostly existed in the larger towns and cities, and most youngsters ended their schooling after 7 years. It was the county's intention to expand this school to a high school as soon as practically possible. This happened in 1947, and the school's name was Telemark Offentlige Landsgymnas. The existence of this school made it possible to establish Telemark College (Distriktshøgskulen i Telemark), which evolved into Telemark University College.

Attractions
Bø is famous for its waterpark Sommarland (the largest of its kind in Norway).  Another tourist site in Bø is the Gygrestol rock formation. There is also Kroa i bø, one of the oldest music venues in Norway. The club won the award for "Concert promoter of the Year 2005" and is based on voluntary work from students of the Telemark University College.

Bø Old Church
Bo Church (Bø kyrkje) dates from ca. 1100. The church is in stone and has 200 seats. It was built in the Romanesque style, with long church plan and choir to the east. The sanctuary, choir loft and the apse are from the Middle Ages, whereas the narthex was built to the 1600s.

Bø Church
Bø New Church (Bø kyrkje) dates from 1875. The church is wooden and has 450 seats. The church was built in Neo-Gothic style. There are wood carvings on the altarpiece, pulpit, lectern and west gallery.

Notable residents

 Johan Henrik Rye (1787–1868) a military officer, jurist and President of the Storting
 Jon Eriksson Helland (1790 in Bø – 1862) a Norwegian Hardanger fiddle maker 
 Olaf Rye (1791 in Bø – 1849) a Norwegian-Danish military officer
 Nils Nilsen Ronning (1870 in Bø – 1962) an American author, journalist and editor
 Olav Gunnarsson Helland (1875 in Bø – 1946) a Norwegian Hardanger fiddle maker
 Neri Valen (1893 in Bø – 1954) politician, Mayor of Bø in 1922
 Halvor Vreim (1894 in Bø – 1966) an architect, saved old wooden buildings
 Olav Kielland (1901–1985 in Bø) a composer and conductor, lived in Bø from 1955
 Hallvard Eika (1920–1989) politician, Mayor of Bø, 1967–1970
 Halvor Kleppen (born 1947 in Bø) a media personality, theme park owner and writer
 Geir Barvik (born 1958 in Bø) civil servant; MD the Norwegian State Housing Bank to 2010
 Margunn Bjørnholt (born 1958 in Bø) a Norwegian sociologist, economist and academic
 John-Arne Røttingen (born 1969 in Bø) medical scientist, CEO of the Research Council of Norway
 Varg Vikernes (born 1973) musician, writer and convicted murderer, lived in Bø after his release
 Øyvind Storesund (born 1975 in Bø) a rock and jazz musician, plays upright bass
 Håkon Anton Fagerås, (grew up in Bø) a sculptor
 Webjørn S. Espeland, (Norwegian Wiki) (born 1979 in Bø) radio personality

Sport 
 Anders Haugen (1888 in Bø – 1984) an American ski jumper bronze medallist at the 1924 Winter Olympics
 Hans Kleppen (1907 in Bø – 2009) a ski jumper, participated in the 1928 Winter Olympics
 Runar Steinstad (born 1967 in Bø) a paralympian athlete, bronze medallist at the 2012 Summer Paralympics
 Elbasan Rashani (born 1993) a Kosovan professional footballer with over 200 club caps, grew up in Bø

Sister cities
The following cities are twinned with Bø:
  Bengtsfors, Västra Götaland County, Sweden
  Puumala, Eastern Finland, Finland

Gallery

References

External links

Municipal fact sheet from Statistics Norway

Bø Sommarland waterpark 
Kroa i Bø music venue

 
Midt-Telemark
2020 disestablishments in Norway
Villages in Vestfold og Telemark